Thunder in the Desert is a 1938 American Western film directed by Sam Newfield, written by George H. Plympton, and starring Bob Steele, Louise Stanley, Don Barclay, Ed Brady, Charles King and Horace Murphy. It was released on March 7, 1938, by Republic Pictures.

Plot

Cast 
Bob Steele as Bob Radford
Louise Stanley as Betty Andrews
Don Barclay as Rusty
Ed Brady as Reno 
Charles King as Curt Harris
Horace Murphy as Sheriff
Steve Clark as Andrews
Lew Meehan as Henchman Mike
Ernie Adams as Tramp
Richard Cramer as Tramp
Budd Buster as Deputy Oscar

References

External links 
 

1938 films
1930s English-language films
American Western (genre) films
1938 Western (genre) films
Republic Pictures films
Films directed by Sam Newfield
American black-and-white films
Films with screenplays by George H. Plympton
1930s American films